Stephen Battersby is a freelance science journalist who has been a News & Views editor at Nature and the features editor at New Scientist, where he serves as an editorial consultant as of 2019.  He earned his bachelor's degree in physics from Oxford University, and his PhD in astrophysics from Imperial College London.

In 2015, Battersby received the Jonathan Eberhart Planetary Sciences Journalism Award for an article on methane tides on Titan, Saturn's largest moon.

References

External links 

 Stephen Battersby at New Scientist
 Stephen Battersby at Nature
 Stephen Battersby at PNAS

Science journalists
Living people
Year of birth missing (living people)
Place of birth missing (living people)
Alumni of the University of Oxford
Alumni of Imperial College London